The Røvik Tunnel  is a road tunnel that is part of Norwegian National Road 80 in the municipality of Fauske in Nordland county, Norway.  It runs parallel to the Nordland Line between Røvik and Valnesfjord, just west of the town of Fauske.

Before the tunnel was opened on August 30, 2011, National Road 80 used to continue along Skjerstad Fjord through Venset, then turning north to Valnesfjord. The old route is now Norwegian County Road 530.

References

Fauske
Road tunnels in Nordland
Tunnels completed in 2011